Nord-Ost-Kultuk (also, Kul’tuk and Nordostovyy Kultuk) is a village in the Neftchala Rayon of Azerbaijan.

References 

Populated places in Neftchala District